The New Adventures of Pinocchio is a 1961 syndicated stop motion animated television series produced by Rankin/Bass Productions in the United States and made by Dentsu Studios in Japan. Created by Arthur Rankin, Jr. and his partner Jules Bass, it was based on the 1883 book The Adventures of Pinocchio written by Italian author, Carlo Collodi. The series was Rankin/Bass' first production to be made in "Animagic", a stop motion puppet animation technique which, in association with the company, was done by Tadahito Mochinaga's MOM Productions.

A total of 130 five-minute "chapters" were produced in 1960–61. These segments made up a series of five-chapter, 25-minute episodes. The show was deliberately designed to not emulate Walt Disney Animation Studios' popular 1940 version of Pinocchio in character design or characterization; the puppet wore a T-shirt and shorts instead of a Tyrolean hat, the Cricket (not Jiminy Cricket) had a high-pitched, grating voice, and Geppetto was calm and deliberate, unlike Disney's excitable and absent-minded woodcarver.

The series premiered the week of February 6, 1961 on select local stations. During 1963–64, the series was also aired in Japan on Fuji TV as part of another stop motion TV series, Prince Ciscorn (シスコン王子, lit. Ciscorn Ōji), based on the manga by Fujiko Fujio and also produced by Tadahito Mochinaga for Studio KAI and Dentsu.

Twenty years later, in 1980, Rankin/Bass produced another stop motion adaptation of the novel for the American Broadcasting Company, a Christmas special called Pinocchio's Christmas, which featured a different voice cast including George S. Irving as Geppetto; Todd Porter as Pinocchio; Alan King as Maestro Fire-Eater; Allen Swift as the Fox; Pat Bright as the Cat; and Diane Leslie as Lady Azura.

Summary
An old wood carver Geppetto narrates the series, explaining on how he made a magically living puppet named Pinocchio, who can walk, jump, run and do other things without strings. In addition, he is also known to have his nose grow whenever he tell lies on anything be it right or wrong. Displeased with the need to continue living as a puppet, Pinocchio sets off on a journey with his friend Cricket to find the Blue Fairy, hoping that she can transform him into a real boy (in other words, a human) with her magic. But along the way, Pinocchio and Cricket encounter the two anthropomorphic animal cons, Foxy Q. Fibble and Cool S. Cat, as well as the greatest adventures, mishaps, danger and excitement than they would ever imagine.

Character voices
Stan Francis - Geppetto
Larry D. Mann - Foxy Q. Fibble
Paul Kligman - Cool S. Cat
Carl Banas - Cricket
Claude Ray
Joan Fowler
Jack Mather

Production staff
Writers/Producers/Directors - Arthur Rankin, Jr., Jules Bass
Animation Director - Tadahito Mochinaga (uncredited)
Puppet Makers - Ichiro Komuro, Kyoko Kita, Reiko Yamagata, Sumiko Hosaka (all uncredited)
Animation - Hiroshi Tabata, Koichi Oikawa, Fumiko Magari, Tadanari Okamoto (all uncredited)

Episodes

 It's No Joke Picnic
 Ring・a・ding・ding・ding
 Sprinkle Sprinkle Little Star
 Ten Cents a Glance
 Pretty Pussycat Nips
 Rocket to Fame
 Short Circuit
 It's Cool in the Cooler
 Back Stage Life
 All Down Hill
 Too Many Ghosts
 Horse Sense
 One Little Indian
 Cattle Rattle
 By Hook or By Crook
 Not So Private Eye
 Cash and Carry Harry
 Dognet
 The Gold Brick Trick
 Simoro's Last Chance
 Romin' in the Glomin'
 Flying Bagpipes
 Hide and Seek
 Stop Gap Sap
 Feud for All
 Glockenspiel
 Peanut Butter Battle
 Upside Down Town
 Robot Rhapsody
 Big Bomb Cake
 Back Track
 Hot Rod Hobo
 Duck Luck
 Danny the Boon
 Dynamite Bright
 O'Lafferty the Magnificent
 Lock Stock and Crock
 Hup Two Three Four
 No Banks Thanks
 The Crick Trick
 Grab Bag
 Pick a Pocket
 Kangaroo Capers
 Paunchy Pouch
 Kangaroo Caught
 Havin' a Ball
 A Choice of Voice
 The Pale Inhale
 Down the Hatch
 Cricket High
 Detour for Sure
 Once Around Please
 The Vast Mast
 The Treasure Measure
 Not So Hot Knot
 The Big Top Stop
 Monkey See
 Big Shot
 A Ticklish Situation
 Clowning Around
 Stroll Around the Pole
 The Bear Facts
 Something's Fishy
 Fast Talk
 Snow Use
 The Highway Man
 To Track a Thief
 Sleep Watcher
 A Dog's Best Friend
 Thrown by the Throne
 The Cast Offs
 Mutiny on the Clipper
 Floundering Around
 The Litterbugs
 Atlantis City
 Steed Stallion
 Chief Big Cheese
 The Water Boy
 The Little Train Robbery
 Simon Says
 Sky Spy
 Glockenspiel's Spiel
 The Gas Man Cometh
 The Impatient Patient
 The Astronuts
 Special Delivery
 Go Fly a Kite
 Marooned
 The Foot Print
 Homeward Bound
 Wish Wish and Away
 Lead of Leprechaun
 Westward Whoa
 TV Time
 Baby Big
 Follow That Horse
 Stage West
 Draw Pardner
 The Race
 The Gold Bug
 Away with the Wind
 The Hard Sell
 The Witch Switch
 Sky High
 Romeo Fibble
 Wanted
 Going Down
 Underground Found
 The Gold Bird
 The Big Heist
 Willy Wiggly
 Substitute
 Borschtville
 A Fair Trail
 The Rescue Rock
 Writers in the Sky
 The Zany Zombies
 Sleep Head
 The Boss Who Came to Dinner
 Witch Switch
 Witching You Well
 Candy Land
 Aw Fudge
 The Phoney Fairy
 The Fastest Wind
 Willy Nilly
 Hog Bellows
 An Ace in the Hole
 Roscoe Romp
 Lady Barber

References

External links
 
 

1960 American television series debuts
1961 American television series endings
1963 Japanese television series debuts
1960s American animated television series
1960 Canadian television series debuts
1961 Canadian television series endings
1960s Canadian animated television series
American children's animated adventure television series
American stop-motion animated television series
American television shows featuring puppetry
Canadian children's animated adventure television series
Canadian stop-motion animated television series
Canadian television shows featuring puppetry
English-language television shows
Japanese-language television shows
Japanese children's animated adventure television series
Japanese television shows featuring puppetry
Television shows based on The Adventures of Pinocchio
Rankin/Bass Productions television series
First-run syndicated television programs in the United States